Yucca brevifolia (also known as the Joshua tree, yucca palm, tree yucca, and palm tree yucca) is a plant species belonging to the genus Yucca. It is tree-like in habit, which is reflected in its common names.

This monocotyledonous tree is native to the arid Southwestern United States, specifically California, Arizona, Utah, and Nevada, and to northwestern Mexico It is confined mostly to the Mojave Desert between  elevation. It thrives in the open grasslands of Queen Valley and Lost Horse Valley in Joshua Tree National Park. Other regions with large populations of the tree can be found northeast of Kingman, Arizona in Mohave County; and along U.S. 93 between the towns of Wickenburg and Wikieup, a route which has been designated the Joshua Tree Parkway of Arizona. The common name Joshua tree apparently comes from Christian iconography.

Taxonomy
The Joshua tree is also called izote de desierto (Spanish, "desert dagger"). It was first formally described in the botanical literature as Yucca brevifolia by George Engelmann in 1871 as part of the Geological Exploration of the 100th meridian (or "Wheeler Survey").

The name "Joshua tree" is commonly said to have been given by a group of Mormon settlers crossing the Mojave Desert in the mid-19th century: The tree's role in guiding them through the desert combined with its unique shape reminded them of a biblical story in which Joshua keeps his hands reached out for an extended period of time to enable the Israelites in their conquest of Canaan. Further, the shaggy leaves may have provided the appearance of a beard. However, no direct or contemporary attestation of this origin exists, and the name Joshua tree is not recorded until after Mormon contact; moreover, the physical appearance of the Joshua tree more closely resembles a similar story told of Moses.

Ranchers and miners who were contemporaneous with the Mormon immigrants used the trunks and branches as fencing and for fuel for ore-processing steam engines. They referred to these fallen or collapsed Joshua trees as tevis stumps.

In addition to the autonymic subspecies Y. b. subsp. brevifolia, two other subspecies have been described: Y. b. subsp. herbertii (Webber's yucca or Herbert Joshua tree) and Y. b. subsp. jaegeriana (the Jaeger Joshua tree or Jaeger's Joshua tree or pygmae yucca), though both are sometimes treated as varieties or forms. Y.b. subsp. jaegeriana has also been treated as its own species.

Growth and development

The trunk consists of thousands of small fibers and lacks annual growth rings, making  determining the tree's age difficult. If it survives the rigors of the desert, it can live for hundreds of years; some specimens survive a thousand years. New plants can grow from seed, but in some populations, new stems grow from underground rhizomes that spread out around the parent tree.

The evergreen leaves are dark green, linear, bayonet-shaped, 15–35 cm long, and 7–15 mm broad at the base, tapering to a sharp point; they are borne in a dense spiral arrangement at the apex of the stems. The leaf margins are white and serrated.

Flowers typically appear from February to late April, in panicles 30–55 cm tall and 30–38 cm broad, the individual flowers erect, 4–7 cm tall, with six creamy white to green tepals. The tepals are lanceolate and are fused to the middle. The fused pistils are 3 cm tall and the stigma cavity is surrounded by lobes. The semi-fleshy fruit that is produced is green-brown, elliptical, and contains many flat seeds. Joshua trees usually do not branch until after they bloom (though branching may also occur if the growing tip is destroyed by the yucca-boring weevil), and they do not bloom every year. Like most desert plants, their blooming depends on rainfall at the proper time. They also need a winter freeze before they bloom.

Once they bloom, the flowers are pollinated by the yucca moth (Tegeticula synthetica), which spreads pollen while laying eggs inside the flower. The  larvae feed on the seeds, but enough seeds remain to reproduce. The Joshua tree is also able to actively abort ovaries in which too many eggs have been produced.

Distribution and habitat

The Joshua tree is native to the southwestern United States (Arizona, California, Nevada, and Utah) and northwestern Mexico. This range mostly coincides with the geographical reach of the Mojave Desert, where it is considered one of the major indicator species for the desert.

Conservation status

Joshua trees are one of the species predicted to have their range reduced and shifted by climate change. Concern remains that they will be eliminated from Joshua Tree National Park, with ecological research suggesting a high probability that their populations will be reduced by 90% of their current range by the end of the 21st century, thus fundamentally transforming the ecosystem of the park. Wildfires, invasive grasses and poor migration patterns for the trees’ seeds are all additional factors in the species’ imperilment. As an example, more than a quarter—or more than 1.3 million Joshua trees—in one of the densest Joshua tree populations in the world in Mojave National Preserve were killed in the Dome Fire in August 2020. Also, concern exists about the ability of the species to migrate to favorable climates due to the extinction of the giant Shasta ground sloth (Nothrotheriops shastensis) 13,000 years ago; ground sloth dung has been found to contain Joshua tree leaves, fruits, and seeds, suggesting that the sloths might have been key to the trees' dispersal. Although ground squirrels are very effective at moving the seeds long distances.

In February 2023, California governor Gavin Newsom's administration proposed a budget trailer bill The Western Joshua Tree Conservation Act to focus on protecting the climate-threatened species and permitting development in the Southern California desert.  The proposed legislation calls for a conservation plan for this and other species, that may be threatended by climate change by 2024 and would authorize the California Department of Fish and Wildlife to permit taking a western Joshua tree only under certain conditions.

Uses and cultivation 
Different forms of the species are cultivated, including smaller plants native from the eastern part of the species range. These smaller plants grow 2.5 m tall and branch when about 1 m tall. Red-shafted flickers make nests in the branches, which are later used by other birds.

Cahuilla Native Americans, who have lived in the Southwestern United States for generations, identify this plant as a valuable resource and call it hunuvat chiy’a or humwichawa. Their ancestors used the leaves of Y. brevifolia to weave sandals and baskets, in addition to harvesting the seeds and flower buds for meals. Native Americans also used the reddish roots to make dye. Yucca tree roots have saponin glycosides.

References

Further reading

External links

 
 
 
Jepson Manual Treatment: Yucca brevifolia
eFloras.orgFlora of North America: Yucca brevifolia
eFloras.org: Range Map
Joshua Tree National Park website
Desert Trees: Yucca brevifolia

brevifolia
Flora of the California desert regions
North American desert flora
Trees of the Southwestern United States
Flora of Northwestern Mexico
Natural history of the Mojave Desert
Joshua Tree National Park
Taxa named by George Engelmann
Garden plants of North America
Ornamental trees
Drought-tolerant trees
Joshua